Brushy Creek is a stream in Nodaway and Worth, counties in Missouri and Taylor County, Iowa in the United States. It is a tributary of Platte River.

The stream flows southward into the northwest corner of Worth County, Missouri. Two miles to the south it veers to the right and enters Nodaway County. It flows south passing under Missouri Route 246 about one mile west of Sheridan. It continues to the south and enters the Platte River just west of the city of Parnell.

Brushy Creek was so named on account of brush near its course.

See also
List of rivers of Iowa
List of rivers of Missouri

References

Rivers of Worth County, Missouri
Rivers of Nodaway County, Missouri
Rivers of Taylor County, Iowa
Rivers of Iowa
Rivers of Missouri